The women's 1500 metres event  at the 1987 IAAF World Indoor Championships was held at the Hoosier Dome in Indianapolis on 8 March.

Results

References

1500
1500 metres at the World Athletics Indoor Championships